The Catalan basketball derby, is the name given to the basketball matches between Barcelona and Joventut both from the Spanish autonomous community of Catalonia. The cities of Barcelona and Badalona, where Joventut is from, are separated by only 10 km.

Head-to-head statistics

Updated as of 28 October 2018.

See also
Lliga Catalana de Bàsquet

References

External links
FC Barcelona official website
Joventut official website

Basketball rivalries
Sport in Catalonia
FC Barcelona Bàsquet
Joventut Badalona